Waitin' for the Hard Times to Go is an album by the Nashville Bluegrass Band, released through Sugar Hill Records in 1993. In 1994, the album won the group the Grammy Award for Best Bluegrass Album.

Track listing
 "Backtrackin'" (Mike Dowling) – 2:58
 "Waitin' for the Hard Times to Go" (Ringer) – 3:16
 "Kansas City Railroad Blues" – 3:57
 "Open Pit Mine" (Gentry) – 3:03
 "Train of Yesterday" – 3:33
 "Father, I Stretch My Hands to Thee" (traditional) – 2:23
 "When I Get Where I'm Goin'" (Allen) – 2:49
 "Waltzing's for Dreamers" (Thompson) – 2:21
 "I Ain't Goin' Down" – 2:30
 "We Decided to Make Jesus Our Choice" (traditional) – 2:39
 "On Again Off Again" (Allen) – 3:46
 "Soppin' the Gravy" (traditional) – 2:24

Personnel

 Dave Allen – Composer
 Jerry Douglas – Dobro, Producer
 Mike Dowling – Composer
 Stuart Duncan – Fiddle, Vocals, Baritone (Vocal)
 Pat Enright – Guitar, Vocals, Tenor (Vocal)
 D.T. Gentry – Composer
 David Glasser – Mastering
 Russell Lee – Photography

 Gene Libbea – Bass, Vocals, Baritone (Vocal), Tenor (Vocal)
 Holland MacDonald – Design
 Señor McGuire – Photography
 Alan O'Bryant – Banjo, Vocals, Tenor (Vocal)
 Jim Ringer – Composer
 Richard Thompson – Composer
 Bil VornDick – Engineer
 Roland White – Mandolin, Bass (Vocal), Vocals

References

External links
 Nashville Bluegrass Band's official site

1993 albums
Nashville Bluegrass Band albums
Sugar Hill Records albums
Grammy Award for Best Bluegrass Album